Sverdlov may refer to Yakov Sverdlov, who was a Bolshevik party administrator.

Sverdlov may also refer to:

 , a Soviet cruiser class
 Sverdlov, Armenia, a village in the Lori Province of Armenia

See also
 Sverdlovsk (disambiguation), places named for Bolshevik leader Yakov Sverdlov
 Sverdlovsky (disambiguation), places named for Yakov Sverdlov

Russian-language surnames